Perfect Bid: The Contestant Who Knew Too Much is a 2017 American documentary film that profiles Ted Slauson, an elementary school mathematics teacher and super fan of The Price Is Right. Interviews with Slauson reveal how he became fascinated with the show in the early 1970s, which drove him to memorize the prices of products, and his involvement with contestant Terry Kniess, who bid perfectly on a showcase in 2008 and gave no credit to Slauson for his assistance.

Synopsis
Ted Slauson spent his early life documenting and memorizing the prices of the prizes on The Price Is Right. When he turned 18, Slauson started traveling to the show to become a contestant. Even when he was not picked from the audience to be a contestant, Slauson yelled out prices—which is famously allowed—helping contestants win cash and money on the show.

Over many years, Slauson called out prices to contestants, allowing them to submit the exact priceor "perfect bid"on various items, and helped a contestant make a "perfect bid" on the final showcase, helping them win both showcases (a feature of the game), totaling tens of thousands of dollars. Prior to that, he had helped two other contestants bid within a small margin of error on the final showcase, which also allowed them to win both showcases, per a feature of the game.

After helping a third contestant, Terry Kniess, with the "perfect bid" to win the double-showcase of prizes the show's producers finally started increasing and changing the diversity of items used on the show, including changing the options packages that impact the prices on automobiles, which are the highest priced single items available for the contestants to price. This makes it less likely that a contestant can remember the prices by simply watching the show over a long period.

Despite Kniess maintaining that he had come up with the perfect bid on his own, Slauson reveals the truth behind the story that has been misrepresented for years. Ted Slauson is the most known contestant in the history of the show for such accuracy.

Cast
 Theodore (Ted) Slauson
 Bob Barker
 Roger Dobkowitz

While Slauson, Barker and Dobkowitz were expressly interviewed for the film, there is also archive footage of Drew Carey discussing the incident with Kevin Pollak, from an episode of Kevin Pollak's Chat Show.

Critical reception
The film has received positive reviews.

Awards
Perfect Bid: The Contestant Who Knew Too Much won best documentary at the Orlando Film Festival in 2017.

References

Bibliography

External links 
 
 

2017 films
2017 documentary films
American documentary films
The Price Is Right
2010s English-language films
2010s American films